Jani Markus Rita (born July 25, 1981) is a Finnish former professional ice hockey winger who last played with Jokerit of the Russian KHL, for whom he played most of his career.

Playing career
Despite limited NHL experience, Rita has played extensively in the American Hockey League and in the SM-liiga in his native Finland. Rita started his hockey career in a youth team of EKS (Espoon Kiekkoseura). He played his first seasons of pro hockey for Jokerit, Helsinki, and was drafted 13th overall in the 1999 NHL Entry Draft by the Edmonton Oilers.

Rita played for HPK in the SM-liiga during the 2004–05 NHL lockout, winning the bronze medal. That season he was awarded the Raimo Kilpiö trophy, and led the league in scoring during the playoffs. He also represented Finland at the 2005 World Hockey Championship, earning one assist. He had signed with Jokerit for the 2005–06 season with a contractual clause enabling him to return to the NHL. When the Oilers offered him a one-year contract in August 2005, Rita signed on to return to North America.

Although once considered a premier prospect at the NHL level, Rita's slow development showed cause for concern to Oilers management. On January 26, 2006, Rita was traded along with Cory Cross, to the Pittsburgh Penguins for Dick Tärnström. He finished the season with just 10 points in 51 games.

It was announced on 2 May 2006 that Rita was to depart Pittsburgh to return to his original club, Jokerit. He was the best goal scorer of SM-liiga in 2006–07 season. After ten more years with Jokerit including the club's transition from the Finnish Liiga to the KHL in 2014, Rita announced his retirement in June 2016.

Career statistics

Regular season and playoffs

International

Awards
 Raimo Kilpiö trophy for gentleman player - 2005
 Aarne Honkavaara trophy for best goal scorer - 2007

References

External links
 

1981 births
Edmonton Oilers players
Edmonton Oilers draft picks
Finnish ice hockey left wingers
Hamilton Bulldogs (AHL) players
HPK players
Jokerit players
Living people
National Hockey League first-round draft picks
Pittsburgh Penguins players
Ice hockey people from Helsinki
Toronto Roadrunners players
Finnish expatriate ice hockey players in the United States
Finnish expatriate ice hockey players in Canada